Mary Adelaide Gescheidt (February 16, 1877 – September 18, 1946) was an American voice teacher, writer, and clubwoman, based in New York City.

Early life 
Gescheidt was born in Mount Vernon, New York, the daughter of Albert F. Gescheidt and Mary Steurer Gescheidt. Her father was a businessman; all her grandparents were born in Germany.

Career 
Gescheidt, was a soprano singer in the early 20th century. She injured her neck in a fall, ending her performing career. After that, she was a vocal coach who worked with opera and concert singers from her studio at Carnegie Hall. Her specialty, advertised as "Miller Vocal Art-Science", involved training and rehabilitating speaking and singing voices damaged by injury, illness, or other defects, in collaboration with throat specialist Frank E. Miller. She wrote about her work in a pamphlet that later became a book, Make Singing a Joy (1930, with a foreword by musicologist Sigmund Spaeth). She emphasized that singing naturally, without excessive training or force, produces a pleasing sound and preserves the voice from strain. Her notable students included actress Betty Blythe and oratorio singer Richard Crooks. 

Gescheidt was active in the National Federation of Music Clubs, especially on a committee to promote quality music in film scores.

Personal life 
Gescheidt died in a hospital in New York City in 1946, at the age of 69.

References 

1877 births
1946 deaths
American singers
Vocal coaches
Clubwomen
People from Mount Vernon, New York